Marc Crosas Luque (born 9 January 1988) is a Spanish retired professional footballer who played as a defensive midfielder. Crosas is also a football analyst for Univision Deportes. He is a Mexican naturalized citizen.

Club career

Barcelona
Born in Sant Feliu de Guíxols, Girona, Catalonia, Crosas came through the ranks at La Liga club FC Barcelona and signed a five-year contract in 2006. On 8 November 2006, Crosas made his first-team debut in a Copa del Rey tie against CF Badalona, coming on as a substitute for Andrés Iniesta in the 76th minute. Crosas was named in the Barcelona squad which competed in the 2006 Club World Cup in December, in Japan where the club finished runners-up. On 12 December 2007, he played in his first Champions League match against VfB Stuttgart at Camp Nou.

Crosas scored the winning penalty in the final of the 2007 Copa Catalunya in which Barcelona beat RCD Espanyol 5–4 on penalties after a 1–1 draw.

Lyon
On 11 January 2008, Barcelona and Ligue 1 club Lyon reached an agreement in which Crosas would play on loan for the French champions until the end of the season, because of the number of players competing for his central midfield position. This happened due to the fact that the Spaniard could not get into the main part of the Catalan club. However, he had not given up hope of playing for the Blaugrana, saying, "I leave with the intention to return. That is my objective." Crosas trained closely with Juninho Pernambucano in order to improve his development at Lyon.

Crosas made his Ligue 1 debut for Lyon on 20 January 2008 in a match against Lens, starting in place of Juninho, who was out with a dislocated toe. Unfortunately for him, Lyon suffered a disappointing defeat, losing 3–0.

When his loan was coming to an end, Jean-Michel Aulas told L'Équipe "It's possible that the player will stay with us. He had a good half season at the club and people like him. We were satisfied by his performances and when we've taken a decision on the new coach, we'll see if he can continue with us."

Celtic

In August 2008, Crosas joined Celtic for a fee of £415,000 rising to £1.6 million depending on appearances, and signed a four-year contract. Barcelona retained a £1.65 million buy-back option which took effect at the end of the 2009–10 season. He was paraded at Celtic Park before the match with St Mirren. He made his debut for the first team as a substitute for Scott Brown against Falkirk at Celtic Park on 23 August 2008 and his first on 13 September against Motherwell at Fir Park. On 4 October, he was awarded man of the match for his performance against Hamilton Academical after completing his first full 90 minutes for Celtic. On 28 January 2009, Crosas scored in the penalty shootout of the Scottish League Cup semi-final against Dundee United. Celtic won the shootout 11–10. On 28 February 2009, Crosas scored his first Celtic goal in a 7–0 home win against St Mirren; a powerful curving shot from 30 yards, which was later voted Celtic's Goal of the Season. He was also voted Celtic's Young Player of the Season in his first season with the club.

In the 2009–10 season, Crosas was not initially a regular starter in midfield as Massimo Donati and loan signing Landry N'Guémo were first picks. After Donati's transfer to Bari, Crosas got a chance to shine and forged a successful partnership with N'Guemo, becoming a staple of the Celtic starting eleven.

At the start of the 2010–11 season, Crosas fell out of favour under new Celtic manager Neil Lennon, but on 22 September he came off the bench to replace Joe Ledley in a 6–0 League Cup win over Inverness Caledonian Thistle.

Volga
Crosas was transferred by Celtic to Russian Premier League side FC Volga in February 2011 for £300,000, signing a contract until December 2014. Crosas also joined Volga to kickstart his career with regular first-team football. Crosas made his debut in Volga shirt in a 2–0 victory over Tom Tomsk. Crosas made 26 appearances and assisted 5 goals in his 11 months at the Russian side.

Mexico
After having trouble adapting to life in Russia with FC Volga, Crosas signed a three-year deal with Mexican side Santos Laguna. Following his move to Mexico, Crosas revealed that his Celtic teammate Efraín Juárez played a part in his surprise move to Mexico. Crosas was introduced to the supporters of Santos Laguna before the match between Santos Laguna and Jaguares which Santos Laguna won 1–0. He made his team debut as a substitute in an away match against Monarcas Morelia where Santos lost 3–1 on 12 February 2012. On 7 March 2012, he made his first appearance in the CONCACAF Champions League against MLS team Seattle Sounders. He assisted Herculez Gomez on the 1–1 draw, with Santos losing the tie 2–1. On 20 May 2012, he played the entire final match of Torneo Clausura 2011–12 against Rayados de Monterrey where Santos Laguna won the title after a 2–1 victory (3–2 in global). He scored his first goal with Santos Laguna on 13 March 2013 during the second leg versus Houston Dynamo in the CONCACAF Champions League which Santos ended up winning 3–1 on aggregate score.

International career
Between 2004 and 2005, Crosas was capped eight times by the Spain under-17 team. He was included in the Spain under-19 team in 2007, but pulled out through injury.

He also represented the Catalonia team from the region of Catalonia in Spain. The team, which is organised by the Catalonia Football Federation, is not affiliated to FIFA or UEFA, but regularly plays friendly matches against other nations.

He made his debut coming on in the 73rd minute to replace Sergio García during a 1–1 draw against the Basque Country and his second appearance against Colombia.

Personal life
Crosas had always lived in Sant Feliu de Guíxols, until moving on loan to Lyon in 2008. His best friend is former FC Barcelona teammate Bojan Krkić. He has a boot sponsorship deal with Nike. He is the younger cousin of Albert Jorquera. As of 2014, he holds Mexican citizenship.

Career statistics

Honours
Lyon
Ligue 1: 2007–08
Coupe de France: 2007–08

Celtic
Scottish League Cup: 2008–09

Santos Laguna
Mexican Primera División: Clausura 2012

Individual
Clydesdale Bank Goal of the Season: 2008–09, vs St. Mirren

References

External links
 
 
 
 

1988 births
Living people
People from Baix Empordà
Sportspeople from the Province of Girona
Spanish footballers
Footballers from Catalonia
Association football midfielders
Segunda División B players
Tercera División players
FC Barcelona C players
FC Barcelona Atlètic players
FC Barcelona players
Ligue 1 players
Olympique Lyonnais players
Scottish Premier League players
Celtic F.C. players
Russian Premier League players
FC Volga Nizhny Novgorod players
Liga MX players
Santos Laguna footballers
Leones Negros UdeG footballers
Spain youth international footballers
Spain under-21 international footballers
Spanish expatriate footballers
Expatriate footballers in France
Expatriate footballers in Scotland
Expatriate footballers in Russia
Expatriate footballers in Mexico
Spanish emigrants to Mexico
Naturalized citizens of Mexico
Spanish expatriate sportspeople in France
Spanish expatriate sportspeople in Scotland
Spanish expatriate sportspeople in Russia
Catalonia international footballers
Cruz Azul footballers
CD Tenerife players
Tampico Madero F.C. footballers